Dub Maniacs on the Rampage is a studio album released by Mad Professor.  It was released in 1993 on the Ariwa label.  This album was the last installment in Mad Professor's "Dub Me Crazy" series.

Track listing 
 "Dub So Hard" - 4:22
 "Rampage in L.A." - 3:51
 "Feelings of Dub" - 4:53
 "Wake Up Dub" - 4:19
 "Maniacal Blues" - 3:54
 "Rue Paganini Dub" - 3:50
 "Acid Meets Dub in Crystal Palace" - 3:36
 "Big Ben Gone Wrong" - 4:45
 "Dub Service" - 4:47
 "Soledad Brothers" - 3:35
 "Miles from Wurzburg" - 3:35
 "Rusty Computor" - 3:06
 "Freaky Girl" - 3:29

Personnel 
The following personnel are credited on the album:
Errol "Black Steel" Nicholson - bass, guitar, drums, keyboards, voices
Bousie - guitar
Susan Cadogan - voices
Errol the General - guitar, drums
David "Fluxy" Heywood - drums
Kate Holmes - flute
Alan Kingpin - voices
Mad Professor - voices, producer, mixing
Leroy "Mafia" Heywood - bass, keyboards
Dennis Nolan - bass, keyboards, voices
Carroll Thompson - voices
William the Conqueror - bass, keyboards

References

External links 
 Dubroom.com Album Review

Mad Professor albums
1993 albums